Leigh Ingalls Saufley (born June 21, 1954) is the dean of the University of Maine School of Law and former Chief Justice of the Maine Supreme Judicial Court. Saufley grew up in South Portland, Maine and attended the University of Maine and the University of Maine School of Law. She was first appointed to the Maine District Court in 1990, and to the Supreme Judicial Court in 1997. She was sworn in as Chief Justice of the Supreme Judicial Court in 2001, becoming both Maine's first woman and the youngest person ever to serve in the position. She served as chief justice until 2020 when she was hired as the eighth Dean of the University of Maine School of Law.

Early life and education
Saufley was born in Portland, Maine on June 21, 1954 to Richard and Janet Ingalls. She grew up in South Portland, Maine with two younger brothers, Andrew and Jim, attended South Portland High School and graduated in 1972. She was a member of Phi Beta Kappa at the University of Maine, graduating with a degree in psychology in 1976. Saufley graduated from the University of Maine School of Law with her Juris Doctor in 1980.

Career

Judiciary path
Shortly after graduating from law school, Saufley accepted a position in a small Ellsworth law firm working with the Maine Attorney General's Office and the Department of Health and Human Services on family law policy, becoming one of the first female deputy attorneys general there. She was also the Assistant to the General Counsel at the U.S. Veterans Administration counsel's office at Togus for a short time.

Governor John R. McKernan Jr. appointed Saufley to the Maine District Court bench in 1990 and to the Superior Court in 1993. In October 1997, Governor Angus King appointed her Associate Justice of the Maine Supreme Judicial Court, and on December 6, 2001, King swore her in as Maine's first female Chief Justice of the Supreme Judicial Court and at the age of 47, becoming the youngest judge ever to serve as chief justice.

Saufley began her second seven-year term as chief justice in 2009 and was sworn in by Governor John Baldacci; her third term began in 2016 when she was sworn in by Governor Paul LePage.

Accomplishments as Chief Justice

Saufley is credited with several key changes in the Maine judicial system during her tenure. She improved the relationship between the Judicial, Legislative and Executive branches of the Maine state government; oversaw the rewriting of the Court's major practice and ethics rules; and helped increase the involvement of Maine Law students with the courts, especially in the area of service to traditionally underserved communities. In 2019, Saufley participated in a task force reexamining sentencing possibilities for juvenile offenders in Maine and voiced her concern with the lack of options available for teen offenders. She also emphasized to the task force the importance of addressing the disproportionate number of juveniles of color and LGBT juveniles in the Maine system.

Saufley's annual State of the Judiciary address reliably contained requests for the Maine Legislature to increase funding for court administration. She secured funding to increase court security, to establish a publicly accessible e-filing system to replace Maine's entirely paper-based files, and to completely replace the Kennebec, Penobscot and Waldo County courthouses and renovate several others.

In the early 2000s, Saufley and Representative John L. Martin conceived of a way to use the court to teach and promote civic education throughout Maine. In 2005, the appellate court began touring high schools across the state, turning auditoriums into courtrooms and giving students, faculty and staff the opportunity to observe arguments firsthand.

In 2010, U.S. Supreme Court Chief Justice John Roberts appointed Saufley to the Federal-State Jurisdiction Committee of the Judicial Conference of the United States.

Saufley has been a member of the Conference of Chief Justices, serving on their Committee on Courts, Children and Families; on the Government Affairs committee; and as chair of the New England Regional Chief Justices Committee.

Notable rulings

In 2016, Maine voters approved a referendum question establishing ranked-choice voting for both primary and general elections for governor, U.S. Senate, U.S. House and state legislature beginning in 2018. In 2017, Saufley wrote a 2017 unanimous advisory opinion of the Supreme Judicial Court that the new law was unconstitutional.

In 2015, Governor Paul LePage vetoed more than 65 bills after the established deadline for doing so, citing the fact that the Maine Legislature was adjourned. The Maine Supreme Judicial Court's advisory ruling unanimously ruled against LePage, upholding the laws.

Law school dean
On April 8, 2020, following a national search, the University of Maine School of Law announced that Saufley would be accepting the position of eighth dean of the school. She retired from the Supreme Judicial Court bench on April 14, 2020 and began her position at Maine Law on April 15. Due to a recent restructuring, Saufley became the first dean to report directly to University of Maine System Chancellor Dannel Malloy instead of to the president of the University of Southern Maine, where the law school was once located.

Personal life
Saufley has been married to Bill Saufley, whom she met while they were both students at the University of Maine School of Law, since 1981. They have two adult children.

During her February 2018 annual address, Saufley announced that she had been diagnosed with breast cancer in 2017, had undergone surgery and radiation, and was "on the other side".

Awards and honors
1998 L. Kinvin Wroth Alumna of the Year Award, University of Maine School of Law
2002 Distinguished Alumna Award, University of Maine
2002 Women of Achievement Award, YWCA
2004 Honorary Doctor of Laws, University of New England
2004 Maryann Hartman Award, Women of Achievement, University of Maine
2005 Caroline Duby Glassman Award, Maine State Bar Association
2005 Portland Regionals Chamber Neal W. Allen Award
2008 Deborah Morton Award, University of New England
2008 Honorary Doctor of Humane Letters, University of Maine at Presque Isle
2010 Woman Who Makes a Difference Award, International Women’s Forum
2013 University of Southern Maine’s Sampson Catalyst for Change Award
2013 State Partner’s Award, Maine Children’s Trust
2021 Maine Women's Hall of Fame inductee

References

External links
Ballotpedia: Leigh Ingalls Saufley
Introducing Dean Leigh Saufley: USM Law introductory video

1954 births
20th-century American judges
20th-century American women judges
21st-century American judges
21st-century American women judges
Chief Justices of the Maine Supreme Judicial Court
Deans of law schools in the United States
Living people
People from South Portland, Maine
University of Maine School of Law alumni
Women chief justices of state supreme courts in the United States